Claudio Manela (April 12, 1894 – November 1975) was a Filipino pitcher in the Negro leagues in the 1920s.

A native of Cavite City, Philippines, Manela made his Negro leagues debut in 1921 with the Cuban Stars (West), and played for the Cuban Stars (East) in 1925. He also played minor league baseball in 1922 for the Hartford Senators. Manela died in Newark, New Jersey in 1975 at age 81.

References

External links
 and Seamheads

1894 births
1975 deaths
Date of death missing
Cuban Stars (East) players
Cuban Stars (West) players
Filipino baseball players
Baseball pitchers
People from Cavite City
20th-century African-American sportspeople
Hartford Senators players
Filipino expatriate sportspeople in the United States